This is a list of houses, commercial buildings, factories, and other structures by architect Howard Van Doren Shaw. Many of his buildings are now listed on the National Register of Historic Places (NRHP), either individually or as a contributing property to a historic district.

Legend
 Demolished or destroyed.

 Disputed authorship (unverified Shaw design)

List of works

References

External links

Lists of buildings and structures by architect